Ozarba hemimelaena is a moth of the family Noctuidae. It is found Madagascar, Somalia, Zambia and Zimbabwe.

References

External links

Acontiinae
Moths of Madagascar
Insects of Somalia
Lepidoptera of Zambia
Lepidoptera of Zimbabwe
Moths of Sub-Saharan Africa